Jorge Vidal (born 1917) was an Argentine gymnast who competed in the 1948 Summer Olympics.

References

External links
  

Gymnasts at the 1948 Summer Olympics
Olympic gymnasts of Argentina
Possibly living people
1917 births
Argentine male artistic gymnasts